John F. Wukovits is a military historian, who specializes in the Pacific theater during World War II.

Education 
He graduated from the University of Notre Dame, where he studied with Bernard Norling.

Career 
Wukovits has also written articles for WWII History, Naval History, and World War II.

Tin Can Titans received the 2018 RADM Samuel Eliot Morison Award for Naval Literature.

His works 
Pacific Alamo: The Battle for Wake Island New York, N.Y.: New American Library, 2003.  
Eisenhower: A Biography New York: Palgrave Macmillan, 2006.  
One Square Mile of Hell: The Battle for Tarawa New York: NAL Caliber, 2006.  
American Commando: Evans Carlson, His WWII Marine Raiders, and America’s First Special Forces Mission New York: NAL Caliber, 2009.  
Black Sheep: The Life of Pappy Boyington. 	Annapolis, Maryland: U.S. Naval Institute, 2013.  
For Crew and Country: The Inspirational True Story of Bravery and Sacrifice Aboard the USS Samuel B. Roberts. New York: St. Martin's Press, 2013.  
Hell from the Heavens: The Epic Story of the USS Laffey and World War II's Greatest Kamikaze Attack. Cambridge, MA: Da Capo Press, a member of the Perseus Books Group, 2015. 
Tin Can Titans: The Heroic Men and Ships of World War II's Most Decorated Navy Destroyer Squadron. 2017.

References

External links

Military historians
University of Notre Dame alumni